Malaxis myurus  is a Mexican species of orchids. It generally has two lance-shaped leaves and an elongated raceme of tiny flowers.

References

External links
photo of herbarium specimen collected in Oaxaca in 1996

Orchids of Mexico
Plants described in 1830
myurus